The Little Chapel-in-the-Woods is the campus chapel at Texas Woman's University in Denton, Texas.

History 
Built during the Great Depression,  Little Chapel has been named one of Texas’ most outstanding architectural achievements. Designed by leading American architect and Denton resident O'Neill Ford with Arch B. Swank Jr. and Preston Geren Sr., recruits from the National Youth Administration (NYA) constructed the building, while more than 300 students in the college's fine arts programs designed and created the building's artwork, including the stained glass windows, lighting, woodwork, doors, ceiling beams, and flooring. 

The chapel received fame on November 1, 1939 when First Lady and NYA advocate Eleanor Roosevelt dedicated the Little Chapel.  Mary Kay Jones, Student Body President, Class of 1940, introduced her to the crowd that had gathered for the dedication.

Since its completion in 1939, the chapel has been used by many as a place of worship, meditation, and celebration.

Weddings 
The first wedding in the Little Chapel took place on September 25, 1939 between Esther Webb (a 1933 Girls Industrial College graduate) and John Hauseman. The couple is listed in the TWU Bride’s Book which now holds the names of every couple to be wed in the chapel since.

Over 100 weddings take place each year within the little chapel.

Awards and recognition
2014, 2015, 2016 & 2017 Little Chapel voted the "Best Wedding Venue" by Denton County

2009 - Little Chapel named as one of the 10 best buildings in the entire state of Texas by Texas Monthly

1983 - Little Chapel named one of the 20 buildings representing "Texas Proudest Architectural Achievements of All Time" by the Texas Society of Architects"

Stained Glass Windows 
The stained glass windows found inside the Little Chapel were designed to the theme "Women Ministering to the Human Needs." Each window pays respect to women in that particular profession. Graduate student Beatrice Paschall supervised the careful design and construction of each window.

The Motherhood Window sits directly over the altar and symbolizes woman as Mother. It is the largest of all the windows in the chapel and the most prominent in position. The illustrations found within the stained glass represent ideals derived from the Biblical conception of motherhood found in Proverbs. These include spiritual strength, desire, leadership, kindness, loyalty and love.

The Nursing Window is dedicated to woman as nurse. This window pays homage to all of the women who paved the road toward modern day nursing. The large figure in the center of the window represents the ideal nurse.

The Teaching Window is dedicated to woman as teacher. The window pays homage to all of the women who used their knowledge as a tool to educate the minds of others. The central figure represents Helen Keller and her teacher Anne Sullivan.

The Music Window is dedicated to woman and her achievement through music. The inscription at the base of the window reads "Gloria in Excelsis Deo"

The Dance Window presents woman as she has followed her desire to find an expression of beauty through movement.

The Science Window represents woman in the fields of chemistry, physics and the biological sciences.

The Social Service Window pays homage to woman and her tireless effort to relieve distress and suffering wherever she has found it.

The Literature Window represents woman as writer.

the Speech Window represents woman in the arts.

The Rose Window is located above the entrance to the chapel and serves as an abstraction reflecting woman’s joy in the physical world around her.

The Signature Window is a small window located in the vestibule that shows the builders, donors, and decorators of the chapel in characteristic pose. Graduate student Beatrice Paschall, under the supervision of local artist and Dentonite, Dorothy LaSelle, supervised the careful design and construction of each window. The windows were crafted by art students at TWU. These windows were created and installed between 1938-1941.

References

Buildings and structures in Denton, Texas
University and college chapels in the United States
Religious buildings and structures in Texas
Tourist attractions in Denton, Texas
National Youth Administration
Texas Woman's University
Buildings and structures completed in 1939